Sempy is a commune in the Pas-de-Calais department in the Hauts-de-France region of France.

Geography
Sempy is located 4 miles (6 km) southeast of Montreuil-sur-Mer on the D129 road, alongside the banks of the small Bras de Bronne river.

Population

Places of interest
 The church of St. Firmin, dating from the thirteenth century
 Traces of an ancient chateau.
 A watermill and a windmill.

See also
Communes of the Pas-de-Calais department

References

Communes of Pas-de-Calais